Events from the year 1883 in Scotland.

Incumbents

Law officers 
 Lord Advocate – John Blair Balfour
 Solicitor General for Scotland – Alexander Asher

Judiciary 
 Lord President of the Court of Session and Lord Justice General – Lord Glencorse
 Lord Justice Clerk – Lord Moncreiff

Events 
 20 January – Fenian dynamite campaign: In Glasgow, bombs explode at Tradeston Gasworks, Possil Street Bridge and Buchanan Street railway station; about a dozen people are injured.
 28 April – the first rugby sevens tournament is played at Melrose RFC.
 3 June – Sabbatarian riot at Stromeferry: the local fishing community prevent the loading of fish (caught by east coast fishermen) from Stornoway ships to railway on a Sunday.
 3 July – SS Daphne sinks on launch at Alexander Stephen and Sons' Linthouse shipyard, leaving 124 dead.
 29 August – Dunfermline Carnegie Library, the first Carnegie library in the world, is opened in Andrew Carnegie's hometown, Dunfermline.
 4 October – the Boys' Brigade is founded in Glasgow.
 November–December – the Tay Whale (a humpback) appears in the Firth of Tay; on 31 December it is harpooned but escapes, dying later.
 Denny Ship Model Experiment Tank at Dumbarton completed.
 Edinburgh Mathematical Society founded.

Sport 
 Curling
 Scotland's first boys' club is established in Wanlockhead.
 Rugby union
 Scotland take part in the inaugural Home Nations Championship.
 Scotlands first home international game played at Raeburn Place in Edinburgh.
 First match against Wales, hosted at St. Helen's Rugby and Cricket Ground in Swansea; Scotland win by three goals to one.

Births 
 17 January – Compton Mackenzie, author and co-founder in 1928 of the Scottish National Party (born in England; died 1972)
 27 January – James Lithgow, industrialist (died 1952)
 24 March – Dorothy Campbell, golfer (died 1945 in the United States)
 12 April – Francis Cadell, Colourist painter (died 1937)
 15 May – Lord Ninian Crichton-Stuart, British Army officer and Unionist politician (killed in action 1915 in France)
 5 June – Mary Helen Young, nurse and resistance fighter during World War II (died 1945 in Germany)
 9 July – John Watson, advocate and sheriff, Solicitor General for Scotland 1929–31 (died 1944)
 21 August – Victor Fortune, British Army officer (died 1949)
 17 October – A. S. Neill, educationalist (died 1973 in England)
 17 December – David Powell, stage and silent film actor (died 1925 in the United States)

Deaths 
 27 March – John Brown, royal servant (born 1826)
 8 May – John Miller, civil engineer (born 1805)
 20 May – William Chambers, publisher and politician (born 1800)
 2 July – John Strain, first Roman Catholic Archbishop of St Andrews and Edinburgh (born 1810)
 9 August – Robert Moffat, missionary (born 1795)
 David Rhind, architect (born 1808)

The arts
 James Guthrie paints A Hind's Daughter and To Pastures New.

See also 
 Timeline of Scottish history
 1883 in the United Kingdom

References 

 
Years of the 19th century in Scotland
Scotland
1880s in Scotland